Coal Valley Township is located in Rock Island County, Illinois. As of the 2010 census, its population was 4,408 and it contained 1,910 housing units.

History
Coal Valley Township was named for coal mines in the vicinity.

Geography

Quad City International Airport is partially in Coal Valley Township.

Demographics

References

External links
City-data.com
Illinois State Archives

Townships in Rock Island County, Illinois
Townships in Illinois